Chavrash (also Romanized as Chāvrash; also known as Chūres) is a village in Baranduz Rural District, in the Central District of Urmia County, West Azerbaijan Province, Iran. At the 2006 census, its population was 265, in 59 families.

References 

Populated places in Urmia County